Ziemba is a Polish surname. Notable people with the surname include:

 Ed Ziemba (born 1932), Canadian politician
 Elaine Ziemba (born c.1942), Canadian politician
 Karen Ziemba (born 1957), American actress, singer and dancer
 Lee Ziemba (born 1989), American football player
 Menachem Ziemba (1883–1943), Polish rabbi
 Wojciech Ziemba (1941–2021), Polish archbishop

See also
 
 Zięba, standard spelling

Polish-language surnames